McCurdie is a surname. Notable people with the surname include:

Alex McCurdie (1895–1917), Scottish footballer
Carolyn McCurdie, British-born New Zealand author

References